The Kiel FK 166 was a single-seat prototype "exercise" biplane built by Kiel Flugzeugbau in the 1930s.

The sole FK166 (registered D-ETON) was a biplane with cantilevered wings constructed mainly of wood with fabric and plywood covering. The elliptical plan upper wings, supported only by cabane struts in the centre, were given 2.5° dihedral, spanning approx ¾ the span of the 0° dihedral lower wing. Fitted with a fixed tail-wheel undercarriage the FK166 also featured a strut braced tailplane at the tip of the fin.

Specifications

References

Citations

Bibliography
Nowarra, Heinz J.. Die Deutsche Luftruestung 1933-1945 - Vol.3 - Flugzeugtypen Henschel-Messerschmitt. Bernard & Graefe Verlag. 1993. Koblenz.  (Gesamtwek),  (Band 3)

FK166
1930s German military trainer aircraft
Single-engined tractor aircraft
Biplanes